The Magic Orange Tree and Other Stories is a collection of nine short stories by Jamila Gavin. Each story of this collection is a product of the child's imagination, according to Gavin in the introduction. The events in the story did not take place anywhere, but are some fantasies in the main character's mind. The nine stories in this collection are:

 Pearly's Adventure with the Giant Bird
 Robbie and the Fearsome Beastie
 Aziz and the Amazing Motorbike Ride
 How Grandma Saved the Day
 John and the Green Dragon
 Midnight Cows
 The Miraculous Orange Tree
 Anna in the Land of Clocks
 Danny and the Cats

References

1979 short story collections
1979 children's books
Children's short story collections
Cattle in literature
Books about cats